OV7, formerly known as La Onda Vaselina, is a Mexican Latin pop group formed in 1989, but it was not until the early 1990s that Onda Vaselina would begin to make their impact. La Onda Vaselina was formed with the members being children, but it was not until after they separated and reunited again in the late 1990s that they changed to "OV7" but then as adults. With a career spanning more than 30 years and several hits in the Latin American markets, OV7 remains as one of the most successful acts in Latin pop history. "OV7 (Onda Vaselina 7)" was the title used for the remaining band members since when they reunited in the late '90s, there were only seven of them in the group, hence the "7" in OV7. The reason for that title (OV7) was because due to legal rights of the "La Onda Vaselina" title, they could not use it as they were reuniting the group but not with all the other members.

The group disbanded in 2003. In 2010 they reunited. As of 2017, the remaining members are Mariana Ochoa, Ari Borovoy, Érika Zaba, Lidia Avila, Oscar Schwebel and occasionally M'Balia Marichal.

History

1989 – 1993: Formation of La Onda Vaselina, Success with three albums, touring 
OV7 followed a trend that began in the 1980s by another pop group named Timbiriche. In 1989, Mexican singer and producer Julissa decided to make her own version of Grease ("Vaselina" in Spanish) after the season finished. Julissa decided to form a group based on the play.  After the development of Timbuktu, she founded "La Onda Vaselina." Shortly after they recorded their successful debut album, with singles "Que Buen Reventón" (their first single) and "Que Triste Es El Primer Adios" (a cover of Neil Sedaka's hit "Breaking Up Is Hard to Do") which became big hits in the early 1990s. With her first album they sold over 100,000 copies and had a successful tour. Their second album Onda Vaselina 2 was one of the most successful albums of the '90s in Mexico with popular hits that became public property such as "El Calendario" and "Voy Voy Voy". Their next album was Dulces Para Ti which was followed by a series of live shows in one of Mexico City's main venues for the Teatro Aldama. The album's biggest hits was "Tu Seras Mi Baby" and "La Llorona Loca".

1995 – 1998: La Band Rock, Touring, Indefinite Hiatus 
Their fourth album was a Regional Mexican Music album named La Banda Rock (The Rock Band, using the word "Banda" both meaning "musical group" and the Mexican music genre), the biggest hit of the album was the song  "Pongánse botas, quitense tennis" (Put some boots on and lose the tennis shoes). The group has also had several hits in Spain from the album.

OV7 took a long break after that and then came back with a more mature sound during adolescence They came out with Hoy (Today), an album that was targeted for the teen market featured alternative rock songs mixed with pop and strong texts Hits were "Sube y Baja" and "Perdon". The album flopped and the group decided to take a long pause in which they also considered a split.

1997 – 2003: Comeback as OV7, CD00, American debut, Disbandment 
In 1997, Onda Vaselina made a huge comeback with a strong album that made history in the Mexican charts: Entrega Total. The album sent the group back to the # 1 spot not only in Mexico but the rest of Latin America. The hits were "Mirame A Los Ojos," "Un Pie Tras Otro Pie," and "Te Quiero Tanto Tanto" which reached # 1 on the Billboard Latin chart is still present in both songs being played at clubs and weddings throughout Latin America, the group also toured and filled the Auditorio Nacional 4 times while they released their album Vuela Más Alto which had the hit "No es Obsesión". After "Vuela Más Alto," Onda Vaselina decided to take a break and ended their relationship with their manager and creator Julissa.

After 8 years passed and Onda Vaselina was ready to come back without Julissa. For legal reasons, changed their name to OV7 (accounting for Onda Vaselina and 7 for the number of members) and released their first single "Enloquéceme" and their album CD00. Around this time, they filled the Auditorio Nacional 10 times at the time reached 1st place in all of Latin America with the singles "Shabadabada," "Más Que Amor," "Jam," and "Enloquéceme." The album sold 2 million copies in Mexico and included an English-speaking song, "Angelica", which was never released.

OV7 tried to make the crossover to English-speakers with an English version of their new single "Love Colada" which was the first single from their album Siete Latidos (Seven Beats). The song was released only promo in North America and because of the group's problems with Televisa they appeared on the Latin American average success. The group was invited to participate in the 2002 World Cup Official Album with the track "Bringing The World Back Home".

In November 2002 the Group announced plans to split on the live TV show Operacion Triunfo, followed by a greatest hits CD, Punto, in 2003. OV7 had a farewell tour and officially split up on June 14, 2003, after 14 years of being together.

Members

Current members

 Mariana Yolanda Ochoa Reyes: 1989–2003, 2010–present.
 Ari Borovoy Hoffman: 1989–2003, 2010–Present.
 Lidia Érika Ávila Beltrán: 1991–2003, 2010–present.
 Érika Zaba Beltrán: 1989–2003, 2010–present.
 Oscar Schwebel Arizmendi: 1989–2003, 2010–Present.
The group as of now consist of 5 members: Lidia Ávila, born in Puebla, Mexico; Ari Borovoy, born in Mexico City; Érika Zaba, born in Mexico City; Oscar Schwebel, born in Ixtapan de la Sal, Edo. de México; and Mariana Ochoa, born in Mexico City. OV7 has had several other members that have lasted less than 1 album with the group.

Daniel Vázquez was one member that lasted until the creation of OV7.  He was replaced by Kalimba Marichal. In 2011, Kalimba's sister, M'Balia Marichal left the group to focus on her family.

Past members

M'balia Marichal Ibar, 1989–2003, 2010–2011.
Kalimba Kadjaly Marichal Ibar, 1993–1994, 2000–2003.
Daniel Isaías Vázquez Sánchez, 1989–1992, 1995–1999.
Anna Borras Canadel, 1989–1990.
Ariatna Leticia Martínez Vargas, 1989–1993.
Rodrigo Álvarez Saviñon, 1989–1993.
Luis García Carranza, 1989–1994.
Bárbara Macías Sánchez, 1990, 1993–1994.
Gonzalo Alva, 1992
Liliana Ríos Iñurreta, 1993–1994
Alejandro Sirvent Barton, 1992–1994.
Jair Roman de Rubin, 1993–1994.

Timeline 

(*) = Promotion

(-) = Signing autographs

(/) = They participated in a video on social media

Discography

Albums as La Onda Vaselina
Studio albums

 La Onda Vaselina (1989)
 La Onda Vaselina, Vol. 2 (1991)
 Dulces Para Ti (1992)
 La Banda Rock (1993)
 Hoy (1995)
 Entrega Total (1997)
 Vuela Más Alto (1998)

Compilation albums

 16 Kilates Musicales (1994)
 Música Compacta (1994)
 Línea de Oro: Qué Triste Es El Primer Adiós (1995)
 Línea de Oro: La Banda Rock (1995)
 La Onda Vaselina: Hacia El Milenio (1999)
 Préndete con Lo Mejor de Onda Vaselina: Onda Naranja Fanta (1999)
 Antología Musical de La Onda Vaselina (2000)
 La Historia Musical de La Onda Vaselina (2001)
 La Onda Vaselina: La Trayectoria (2004)
 La Onda Vaselina 3pack (2008)
 La Más Completa Colección (2009)
 Las Número 1: La Onda Vaselina (2010)
 Simplemente Lo Mejor de La Onda Vaselina (2010)
 La Historia (2011)
 16 Éxitos de Oro (2012)

Albums as OV7 
Studio albums

 CD00 (2000)
 Siete Latidos (2001)
 Punto (2003)
 Forever 7 (2012)
 A Tu Lado (2013)

Live Albums

 OV7 En Directo – Rush (2001)
 Primera Fila (2010)
 En Vivo Desde El Palacio de Los Deportes (2011)
 OV7 & Kabah: En Vivo (2015)
 90's Pop Tour (2017)

Compilation albums

 Punto OV7 (2003)
 Combo de Éxitos (2006)
 Lo Mejor de OV7 (2006)
 Personalidad OV7 (2015)

Singles

References

Latin pop music groups
Mexican pop music groups
Musical groups from Mexico City
Mexican dance musicians
Musical groups disestablished in 2003
Musical groups established in 1989
Musical groups reestablished in 2010
Musical groups reestablished in 2013
Sony Music Latin artists